Voda  (Cyrillic: Вода, Polish: Woda, Belarusian: Вада Vada) is water in several Slavic languages. It may refer to:
 "Voda" (song), a song by Ana Soklič representing Slovenia in Eurovision Song Contest 2020
 Voda, Kansas, United States
 Krista Voda (born 1974), American sportscaster

See also
 Bela Voda (disambiguation)
 Červená Voda (disambiguation)
 Dobrá Voda (disambiguation)
 Stará Voda (disambiguation)
 
 Vodice (disambiguation)
 Wasser (disambiguation)